Stagmomantis gracilipes, common name Arizona tan mantis, is a species of praying mantis in  the family Mantidae.  They are native to the south-western United States, Mexico and Central America.

See also
Arizona mantis
List of mantis genera and species

References

Mantidae
Mantodea of North America
Insects of Central America
Insects of Mexico
Insects of the United States
Fauna of the Southwestern United States
Insects described in 1907